Cajabamba is one of 30 administrative regions in the Nariño Department, Colombia. It is a rural vereda touching the municipality of Consacá.

Subdivisions of Colombia
Municipalities of Nariño Department